Jackson County School District is a school district in Jackson County, Alabama. The district enrolls approximately 5,150 students and operates 17 schools, including five K–12 schools and one traditional high school. The superintendent is Kevin Dukes. It is one of two school districts in the county, the other being Scottsboro City Schools.

Facilities
There are 17 schools, including five K–12 schools:

High schools
Earnest Pruett Center of Technology, Hollywood
North Jackson High School, Stevenson
North Sand Mountain School (K–12), Higdon
Pisgah High School (K–12), Pisgah
Section High School (K–12), Section
Skyline High School (K–12), Skyline
Woodville High School (K–12), Woodville

Primary/elementary schools
Bridgeport Elementary, Bridgeport
Bridgeport Middle, Bridgeport
Bryant Elementary (K–6), Bryant
Dutton Elementary (K–8), Dutton
Flat Rock Elementary (K–8), Flat Rock
Hollywood Elementary (K–8), Hollywood
Macedonia Elementary (K–8), Section
Rosalie Elementary (K–8), Rosalie
Stevenson Elementary, Stevenson
Stevenson Middle, Stevenson

Former school
Paint Rock Valley High School, Princeton – Closed in May 2018 and merged into Skyline and Woodville schools

See also
Scottsboro City Schools
DeKalb County School District – Located in neighboring DeKalb County

References

External links
 

Education in Jackson County, Alabama